Don Giovanni is a 1787 opera with music by Wolfgang Amadeus Mozart.

Don Giovanni may also refer to:
 Don Juan, a legendary, fictional libertine, basis of the opera
 Don Giovanni Tenorio, a 1787 opera by Giuseppe Gazzaniga
 Don Giovanni (album), a 1986 album by Lucio Battisti
Don Juan (1955 film), an Austrian opera-film
 Don Giovanni (1970 film), an Italian comedy-drama film
 Don Giovanni (1979 film), a French-Italian film
 Don Giovanni Records, an independent record label